Gregory Gallant (born September 16, 1962), better known by his pen name Seth, is a Canadian cartoonist. He is best known for his series Palookaville and his mock-autobiographical graphic novel It's a Good Life, If You Don't Weaken (1996).

Seth draws in a style influenced by the classic cartoonists of The New Yorker. His work is highly nostalgic, especially for the early-to-mid-20th Century period, and of Southern Ontario. His work also shows a great depth and breadth of knowledge of the history of comics and cartooning.

Early life and education
Seth was born Gregory Gallant on September 16, 1962, in Clinton, Ontario, Canada. His parents were John
Henry Gallant and the English-born Violet Daisy Gallant ( Wilkinson); he was the youngest of their five children. His family moved frequently but considers Strathroy, Ontario his home town. He was inward, unathletic, and had few friends, and took to comic books and drawing at a young age.

Seth attended the Ontario College of Art in Toronto from 1980 to 1983. He became involved with the punk subculture and began wearing outlandish clothing, bleaching his hair, wearing makeup, and frequenting nightclubs. He took on the pen name Seth in 1982.

Career
Seth, then living in Toronto, first drew attention to his work in 1985 when he took over art duties from the Hernandez brothers for Dean Motter's Mister X from Toronto publisher Vortex Comics. His run covered issues  (1985–88), after which he did commercial artwork for publications including Saturday Night and Fashion. In 1986 he met fellow Toronto-based Vortex artist Chester Brown, and in 1991 Toronto-based American cartoonist Joe Matt. The three became noted for doing confessional autobio comics in the early 1990s, and for depicting each other in their works.

In April 1991 he launched his own comic book, Palookaville, with Montreal publisher Drawn & Quarterly. By this time, Seth's artwork had evolved to a style inspired by The New Yorker cartoons of the 1930s and 1940s.

He is also a magazine illustrator and book designer, perhaps best known for his work designing the complete collection of Charles M. Schulz's classic comic strip Peanuts. The books, released by Fantagraphics Books in 25 separate volumes (so far) combine Seth's signature aesthetic with Schulz's minimalistic comic creation. Similarly, he is designing the Collected Doug Wright, and the John Stanley Library.

Seth's illustration work includes the cover artwork for Aimee Mann's album Lost in Space (2001) and the jacket and French flaps for the Penguin Classics Portable Dorothy Parker (2006).

Clyde Fans, the story of two brothers whose trade in electric fans suffers and eventually goes out of business from the failure to adapt to the rise of air conditioning, was serialized in Palooka-ville. Seth's short graphic novel Wimbledon Green, about an eccentric comic-book collector, was published in November 2005.

Graphic novels
From September 2006 to March 25, 2007, Seth serialized a graphic novel titled George Sprott (1894–1975), for the Funny Pages section of The New York Times Magazine. Selections from George Sprott were featured in Best American Comics 2009. In the liner notes of that publication, Seth announced he was expanding Sprott into a book, filling in gaps that were cut to meet the restraints given by NYTM. The book was published by Drawn & Quarterly in May 2009.

Seth's affection for early- and mid-20th century popular culture and his relative disdain for pop culture since then is a recurrent theme in his work, both in terms of the characters (who are often nostalgic for the period) and his artistic style. 

Seth's artwork has landed on the cover of The New Yorker three times, which he said was a professional milestone he was happy to achieve.

Seth collaborated with children's novelist Lemony Snicket on his four-part series All the Wrong Questions, starting with Who Could That Be at This Hour? released on October 23, 2012 and ending with Why Is This Night Different From All Other Nights? released on September 29, 2015.

Model buildings
 A selection of Seth's original models (studies for his fictional city, Dominion) has been exhibited extensively, most notably at the Phoenix Art Museum in 2007 and the Art Gallery of Ontario in 2005 and 2017.

In 2008, Seth collaborated with the Kitchener-Waterloo Art Gallery and RENDER (now the University of Waterloo Art Gallery), on an exhibition titled "The North Star Talking Picture House". For this exhibition one of the buildings from Seth's Dominion City project was re-built at the Kitchener-Waterloo Art Gallery as a walk-in theatre wherein visitors could sit and watch a program of black and white documentary shorts that had been produced by the National Film Board of Canada. 

Seth is the subject of the 2014 documentary film Seth's Dominion, which received the grand prize for best animated feature at the Ottawa International Animation Film Festival.

Personal life
As of 2004, Seth lived in Guelph, Ontario, with his wife Tania Van Spyk, whom he married in 2002.

Awards
Seth has won a number of industry awards throughout his career, and in 2011 was honoured by being the first cartoonist to win the literary Harbourfront Festival Prize. In 2020, Clyde Fans became the first graphic novel ever to receive a Giller Prize nomination.

{| class="wikitable"
|-
! style="background:#B0C4DE;"|Year
! style="background:#B0C4DE;"|Organization
! style="background:#B0C4DE;"|Award for
! style="background:#B0C4DE;"|Award
|-
|rowspan="2"|1997
|rowspan="2"|Ignatz Awards
|Outstanding Artist
|Seth
|-
|Outstanding Graphic Novel or Collection
|It's a Good Life, If You Don't Weaken
|-
|rowspan="2"|2005
|Eisner Awards
|rowspan="2"|The Complete Peanuts
|Best Publication Design
|-
|Harvey Awards
|Special Award for Excellence in Presentation
|-
|2011
|Authors at Harbourfront Centre
|Harbourfront Festival Prize
|Seth
|-
|}

Bibliography

Books and collections

Other
(2002) Inner Drawings and Cover Art for the Record Lost In Space by Aimee Mann, Super Ego Records.
(2002) Cover art and design for the CD Vinyl Cafe Inc. Coast to Coast Story Service by Stuart McLean, Vinyl Cafe Productions, .
(2003) Cover art and illustrations for the book Vinyl Cafe Diaries by Stuart McLean, Viking/Penguin Books Canada, .
(2004) Editing, Illustrations and cover art for "Bannock, Beans & Black Tea" by J. H. Gallant – Montreal: Drawn & Quarterly, 
(2004) Cover art and design for the CD A Story-Gram from Vinyl Cafe Inc. by Stuart McLean, Vinyl Cafe Productions, .
(2005) Cover art and illustrations for the book Stories from the Vinyl Cafe (10th anniversary edition) by Stuart McLean, Penguin Canada, .
(2005) Design and Inner drawings for "Christmas Days", by Derek McCormack, Anansi, .
(2006) Cover art and illustrations for the book Secrets from the Vinyl Cafe by Stuart McLean, Viking Canada, .
(2006) Cover art and illustrations for the book Home from the Vinyl Cafe by Stuart McLean, Penguin Canada, .
(2006) Forty Books of Interest: A Supplement to Comic Art No. 8
(2007) Design and Inner drawings for "Cocktail Culture", by Mark Kingwell, 
(2007) Cover art and design for the CD An Important Message from the Vinyl Cafe by Stuart McLean, Vinyl Cafe Productions, .
(2008) Design and Inner drawings for "The Idler's Glossary," by Joshua Glenn and Mark Kingwell, Biblioasis, .
(2008) Cover art and design for the CD The Vinyl Cafe Storyland by Stuart McLean, Vinyl Cafe Productions, .
(2009) Cover of The Criterion Collection's DVD release of Leo McCarey's Make Way for Tomorrow (spine #505).
(2009) Cover art and design for the CD Planet Boy by Stuart McLean, Vinyl Cafe Productions, .
(2010) Cover art and design for the CD Out and About by Stuart McLean, Vinyl Cafe Productions, .
(2011) Design and Inner drawings for "The Wage Slave's Glossary", by Joshua Glenn and Mark Kingwell, Biblioasis, .
(2013) Cover of The Criterion Collection's Blu-ray/DVD release of Charlie Chaplin's City Lights (spine #680).

(2017) Christmas Ghost Stories (Charles Dickens' The Signalman, A. M. Burrage's One Who Saw, Marjorie Bowen's The Crown Derby Plate, Edith Wharton's Afterward, M. R. James's The Diary of Mr. Poynter, E. F. Benson's How Fear Departed the Long Gallery, W. W. Jacobs' The Toll House, and Algernon Blackwood's The Empty House) designed and illustrated by Seth
(2018) Cover of The Criterion Collection's Blu-ray and DVD release of Gregory La Cava's My Man Godfrey (spine #114).

Further reading

References

Works cited

External links

1962 births
Album-cover and concert-poster artists
Artists from Ontario
Alternative cartoonists
Canadian comics artists
Canadian comics writers
Canadian cartoonists
Canadian graphic novelists
Eisner Award winners for Best Publication Design
Harbourfront Festival Prize winners
Harvey Award winners for Special Award for Excellence in Presentation
Ignatz Award winners for Outstanding Artist
Living people
OCAD University alumni
People from Chatham-Kent
People from Huron County, Ontario
People from Strathroy-Caradoc
Pseudonymous artists
Pseudonymous writers
Writers from Ontario